Long Pond Park is a park preserve on the South Shore of Staten Island, New York City. Long Pond Park is roughly bounded by Hylan Boulevard on the south, Page Avenue on the west, Amboy Road on the north, and Richard Avenue on the east. It is an important stopping point for migrating birds in the Atlantic Flyway.

The majority of parkland was created in 1997 when the New York City Department of Parks and Recreation acquired  of land surrounding Long Pond. In addition to serving as a nature preserve, Long Pond Park also forms part of the Staten Island Bluebelt, a stormwater drainage system.

References

External links 
  Long Pond Park Preserve

Parks in Staten Island
Nature reserves in New York (state)